is the administrative centre of Sunndal Municipality in Møre og Romsdal county, Norway. The village of Sunndalsøra lies at the mouth of the river Driva at the beginning of the Sunndalsfjord. Some of these mountains around Sunndalsøra are used for BASE jumping. 

Location
Norwegian National Road 70 runs through the village of Sunndalsøra on its way from the town of Kristiansund to Oppdal Municipality in the neighboring Trøndelag county.

Economy
Sunndalsøra is the largest village in Sunndal Municipality and it is home to Hov Church, the main church for the parish. Norsk Hydro operates an aluminium plant at Sunndalsøra. About 900 employees work at the plant, which has been operating since 1954.  In 2004, the plant was modernized to become the biggest and among the most modern aluminium plants in Europe, greatly reducing pollution. In addition to aluminium related research, aquaculture research also takes place in Sunndalsøra, and many also work in public service in Sunndal municipality.

Climate
Sunndalsøra has a temperate oceanic climate (Cfb). Atlantic lows can produce a strong foehn effect in winter. This occurs when there is a strong low located southwest of the coast bringing mild air from the Atlantic Ocean, and the air is further warmed when forced over the mountains, and a dry warm air comes down on the leeward side down to the fjord. This is also the warmest winter temperature ever recorded in Scandinavia. And in February with  recorded February 23, 1990. 

The record high  is from July 2014, and the record low  is from February 2010.

Old climate normal

Media gallery

References

External link

Sunndal
Villages in Møre og Romsdal